Melese postica is a moth of the family Erebidae. Described by Francis Walker in 1854, it is found in Brazil, Peru, Suriname and Venezuela.

References

 

Melese
Moths described in 1854